KWRP (690 kHz, "Cruisin Oldies") is a commercial AM radio station in Pueblo, Colorado.  It airs a rhythmic oldies radio format and is owned by Michael Hernandez, through licensee Western Radio, Ltd.  The transmitter is off Oak Street in Pueblo.

Because AM 690 is a Canadian & Mexican clear-channel frequency, KWRP is limited in power, broadcasting at 250 watts by day and only 24 watts at night.  It uses a non-directional antenna.  KWRP also broadcasts on two FM translators: K262BB at 100.3 MHz and K230BZ at 93.9 MHz.

Translators
In addition to the main station, KWRP is relayed by an additional translator to widen its broadcast area.

References

External links

WRP
Radio stations established in 1958
1958 establishments in Colorado
Rhythmic oldies radio stations in the United States